The Terak 8510/a was a graphical desktop workstation developed by the Terak Corporation in 1977. It was among the first desktop personal computers with a bitmap graphics display.  It was a desktop workstation with an LSI-11 compatible processor, a graphical framebuffer, and a text mode with downloadable fonts.  The combined weight of processor, display, and keyboard was approximately 50lb. Despite the lack of an MMU, it was capable of running a stripped version of UNIX version 6. It was the first personal machine on which the UCSD p-System was widely used. Various universities in the USA used it in the late 1970s through mid-1980s to teach Pascal programming. It provided immediate graphic feedback from simple programs encouraging students to learn.  

Three entrepreneurs started the Terak Corporation in 1975: Brian Benzar, William Mayberry and Dennis Kodimer.  Terak products were manufactured in Scottsdale, Arizona from 1976 thru 1984. Sales reached $10M and Terak was publicly traded in 1983-84.  Besides the original frame-buffer-centric 8510/a, other products were developed: color graphics and a Unix workstation. A Terak computer was on display at the Boston Museum of Science and also the Jefferson Computer Museum.

References

External links
Terak information by Mark Riordan (mirror)
Terak information at 
Terak information at 

Computer workstations
PDP-11